Leptostales hepaticaria is a species of geometrid moth in the family Geometridae.

The MONA or Hodges number for Leptostales hepaticaria is 7175.

References

Further reading

 
 

Sterrhinae
Articles created by Qbugbot
Moths described in 1858